The Samaypur Badli is a terminal station on the Yellow Line of the Delhi Metro. It is an elevated station and is located in Samaypur Badli, Rohini Sector-18 in the National Capital Region of Delhi in India. The station was inaugurated on 10 November 2015.

The Station

Station layout

Facilities

Entry/exit

Connections

Bus
Delhi Transport Corporation bus routes number 106A, 165, 165A, 879A serves the station from nearby Samaypur Badli bus stop.

See also
Badli
List of Delhi Metro stations
Transport in Delhi
Delhi Metro Rail Corporation
Delhi Suburban Railway
Delhi Transport Corporation
North Delhi
National Capital Region (India)
List of rapid transit systems
List of metro systems

References

External links

 Delhi Metro Rail Corporation Ltd. (Official site) 
 Delhi Metro Annual Reports
 UrbanRail.Net – descriptions of all metro systems in the world, each with a schematic map showing all stations.

Delhi Metro stations
Railway stations in India opened in 2015
2015 establishments in Delhi
Railway stations in North Delhi district